The 1985 Italy rugby union tour of Zimbabwe was a series of matches played between June and July 1985 and in Zimbabwe by Italy national rugby union team.

Results 
Scores and results list Italy's points tally first.

References

Italy
tour
Italy national rugby union team tours
Rugby union tours of Zimbabwe